Marungapuri is a state assembly constituency in Tiruchirappalli district in Tamil Nadu. It is one of the 234 State Legislative Assembly Constituencies in Tamil Nadu, in India.

Election results

2006

2001

1996

1991

1989

1984

1980

1977

References

External links
 

Former assembly constituencies of Tamil Nadu
Tiruchirappalli district